The Flag (Standard) of the President of Ukraine is the official flag of the President of Ukraine.

The Presidential Flag of Ukraine was confirmed by the decree of the President of Ukraine as of November 29, 1999 and used during inaugural ceremony. It is the chairman of the Constitutional Court of Ukraine that presents it to the president. On delivering his inaugural address, the president takes a special seat at the session hall of the Verkhovna Rada next to which the president's colour is placed.

Design 
The president's colour represents a blue square cloth bearing the golden trident in the center – the Sign of Prince Volodymyr the Great's State, edged with gold vegetative ornament. Two-sided silken cloth was embroidered with the use of computer technologies. One side of the president's colour bears more than a million stitches of a pure gold and yellow gold threads. The embroidered trident has volume due to a special lining. And the flags of the British King, US and French presidents are made with the use of the same technology.

See also 

 State symbols of the president of Ukraine
 Flag of Ukraine

References

External links 
 Ukraine - Presidential Flag at Flags of the World
 Official website of the President of Ukraine
 

National symbols of Ukraine